INS Prachand (K90) (Intense) was a Chamak class missile boat of the Indian Navy.

References

Chamak-class missile boats
Fast attack craft of the Indian Navy

Naval ships of India